Karl Heinrich Brüggermann (1810–1887) German by birth, Brüggermann became a journalist of moderate liberal beliefs.  He became editor-in-chief of the Kölnische Zeitung from 1845 through 1855.

References

1810 births
1887 deaths
19th-century German journalists
German male journalists
German journalists
19th-century German male writers
19th-century German writers